Mazhan (also Romanized as Māzhān and Mājān) is a village in Jolgeh-ye Mazhan Rural District, Jolgeh-ye Mazhan District, Khusf County, South Khorasan province, Iran. At the 2006 National Census, its population was 420 in 125 households, when it was in the former Khusf District of Birjand County. The following census in 2011 counted 532 people in 149 households.

The latest census in 2016 showed a population of 476 people in 151 households, by which time the district had been separated from the county and Khusf County established with two new districts. It was the largest village in its rural district.

References 

Khusf County

Populated places in South Khorasan Province

Populated places in Khusf County